George Jordan (1917 – 8 July 1944) was a Scottish footballer who played in the Scottish League for Cowdenbeath as a right back.

Personal life 
In 1940, early in the Second World War, Jordan enlisted as a private in the Black Watch. He was killed in the Battle of Normandy on 8 July 1944 while serving with the 7th Battalion, Black Watch, part of the 51st (Highland) Division, and was buried in Ranville War Cemetery.

Career statistics

Honours 
Cowdenbeath

Scottish League Second Division: 1938–39

Individual

Cowdenbeath Hall of Fame

References

Scottish footballers
Cowdenbeath F.C. players
Scottish Football League players
1944 deaths
Association football fullbacks
Partick Thistle F.C. players
Kilbirnie Ladeside F.C. players
St Johnstone F.C. wartime guest players
British Army personnel killed in World War II
Black Watch soldiers
1917 births
Burials at Ranville war cemetery
Scottish military personnel